The Infanteriegewehr Modell 1842 was one of the first standardised service rifles used by the Swiss armed forces. It was introduced in 1842 as a result of a decision by the authorities of the Old Swiss Confederacy to standardise the weapons of the then still separate armies of the Swiss Cantons.

The weapon was refitted in 1859 (T.59) and again in 1867 (T.67) with a Milbank-Amsler receiver system to convert it to a breech loader. Some weapons were also retrofitted with rifled barrels in the 1860s.

References

External links
 Data and pictures regarding the 1867 breechloader conversion on militaryrifles.com

Rifles of Switzerland
Early rifles
Muzzleloaders
Hinged breechblock rifles